Kazan Aircraft Production Association (KAPO) is an aircraft manufacturer based in Kazan, Russia. It has built more than 18,000 aircraft of 34 types during its history.

History
The company traces its origins to the Fili plant of the Russo-Balt corporation, which was established as an automobile production plant in April 1916. In November 1922, the Soviet Union signed a joint venture agreement with the German aircraft manufacturer Junkers, and the Fili facility was renamed State Aircraft Factory (GAZ) No. 7. The Fili site later became the Khrunichev Space Center.

As relations with the German government worsened, the plant was taken over by the Soviets and in 1927 it was renamed Zavod No. 22 Ten Years October Plant, and later it was named after S.P. Gorbunov. In 1941 the plant was evacuated to Kazan, and in 1946 it absorbed the Heinkel facility from Elsnitz.

KAPO currently produces Tu-214 passenger planes and Tu-160 strategic bombers. Prior to their cancellation, there were plans to produce Tu-334 regional airliners and Tu-330 freighters.

According to a 2010 article, after KAPO has upgraded the current Russian bomber fleet (see Tupolev Tu-160) it will start production of a "new-generation strategic bomber", the PAK DA.

See also
 Kazanka (boat)

References

External links

  KAPO official website

Companies based in Kazan
Aircraft manufacturers of the Soviet Union
Tupolev